Stadium Bus Stand is the largest Private Bus Stand and one among the total four bus stands in the city of Palakkad. Palakkad City has four Bus Stations includes Palakkad KSRTC bus station and three private Bus stands named Stadium bus stand, municipal bus stand, and town bus stand. The stand is located on the heart of the Palakkad City near the Indira Gandhi Municipal Stadium.

Service
Private bus services to Kozhikode, Sulthan Bathery, Pollachi, Thrissur, Malampuzha, Railway Colony, Chittur, Kollengode, Kozhinjampara, Walayar, etc starts from here in Palakkad. Small and executive restaurants, hotels, Shopping centres are close by the stand.

Construction
The construction of a new terminal adjacent to the current bus stand is under progressing with the Amrut fund of the Palakkad Municipality. Work began in 2019.

A bypass of the station to improve access to it from the north was approved in 2014 and has been partially constructed, but not completed.

See also
Palakkad
Palakkad KSRTC bus terminal
Palakkad Junction railway station
Palakkad District

References

Buildings and structures in Palakkad district
Transport in Palakkad
Bus stations in Kerala